Ilya Sergeyevich Kazakov (born 13 May 1978 in Kirov) is a former Russian football player.

References

1978 births
Sportspeople from Kirov, Kirov Oblast
Living people
Russian footballers
FC Saturn Ramenskoye players
Russian Premier League players
FC Dynamo Brest players
Russian expatriate footballers
Expatriate footballers in Belarus
Association football goalkeepers